Cannabis etiquette is the set of conventional rules of behavior when consuming cannabis.

Smoking
"Bogarting" is holding a joint for too long without actually smoking, therefore wasting the cannabis and possibly preventing others from also consuming.

Books
 Higher Etiquette: A Guide to the World of Cannabis, From Dispensaries to Dinner Parties, Lizzie Post

References

External links

 Pot Etiquette: Mind Your Marijuana Manners, Boston
 A Modern Smoker's Guide to Cannabis Etiquette, Thrillist.com
 A Simple Guide to Proper Weed Etiquette, Wikileaf

Cannabis
Etiquette